Milford or Millford, historically called Ballynagalloglagh, is a small town and townland in County Donegal, Ireland. The population at the 2016 census was 1,037.

The Tirconaill Tribune is headquartered here.

History and name
Located north of Letterkenny, the town was founded in the 18th century by the Clement family. It was named after a mill that was located on Maggie's Burn on the edge of the town.

This town is the ancestral home of a U.S. president, James Buchanan, whose father, also named James Buchanan, immigrated from here to America in 1783.

The Irish Baile na nGallóglach literally means "town of the gallóglach". The gallóglaigh (anglicised gallowglass) were an elite class of mercenary warrior who came from Gaelic-Norse clans in Scotland between the mid-13th century and late 16th century. A battle between the Irish (helped by gallóglaigh) and the English took place on a hill in the townland and this is where the name comes from.

Amenities
The town once had two major employers: the Milford Bakery & Flour Mills and McMahons garage, but both are now long gone. There are now a post office, four supermarkets, a veterinary practice, three pubs, a health centre, a library with council offices, a fire station and fishing lakes. It is not far from four different beaches: Portsalon, Rathmullan, Downings and Tramore. It is a feeder town to Letterkenny.

Education
There are a National School, Scoil Mhuire Milford; two secondary schools, Loreto Community School and Mulroy College; and an Adult Education ETB centre.

People
 Patsy Gallacher (1891-1953) - association footballer, born in Milford
 Sean Ferriter (born 1938) - Gaelic footballer, born in Milford
 Willie Hay (born 1950) - Northern Ireland politician, born in Milford
 Amber Barrett (born 1996) - Footballer, born in Milford

Gallery

See also
List of populated places in Ireland

References

External links

Milford official website

Towns and villages in County Donegal
Millford